Same-sex marriage in Ecuador has been legal since 8 July 2019 in accordance with a Constitutional Court ruling issued on 12 June 2019 that the ban on same-sex marriage was unconstitutional under the Constitution of Ecuador. The ruling took effect upon publication in the government gazette on 8 July. Ecuador became the fifth country in South America to allow same-sex couples to marry, after Argentina, Brazil, Uruguay and Colombia, but adoption by married couples remains restricted to opposite-sex couples. The country has also recognized same-sex civil unions since 2008.

Civil unions

Since the early 20th century, opposite-sex civil unions, available after two years of cohabitation, have been granted the same rights as civil marriages. In the late 19th century, the liberal revolution led by Eloy Alfaro established the separation of church and state in Ecuador. Since the consolidation of this separation in the first decades of the 20th century, only civil marriage or unions have been recognized by the state.

During debate over the 2008 Ecuadorian Constitution, LGBT organizations campaigned for the inclusion of same-sex civil unions, which were eventually included in Article 68 of the Constitution, despite protests from the Catholic Church and evangelical groups. Under the text of the new Constitution, the only difference between same-sex and opposite-sex unions is that adoption by same-sex couples is not permitted; adoption rights are the same for civil unions as for civil marriages, but do not extend to same-sex unions. Protection against discrimination based on sexual orientation had already been introduced in the 1998 Constitution, Ecuador being among the first three countries in the world to adopt such a constitutional protection, alongside South Africa and Fiji.

President Rafael Correa said he wanted the document to allow same-sex unions, saying that "the profoundly humanistic position of this government is to respect the intrinsic dignity of everyone, of every human being, independently of their creed, race, sexual preference. We will give certain guarantees to stable gay couples but matrimony will continue being reserved for a man, a woman and the family. Every person has dignity, that's to say, one must respect a person independently of their sexual preference. Be careful not to deny employment to someone because of their sexual preference. That is discrimination, that is unconstitutional."

The Constitution was approved in a referendum by 69.46% of voters, and was officially recorded on 20 October 2008. The first same-sex union was recognised in August 2009.

Text of Article 68 of the Ecuador Constitution 
In Spanish:  Art. 68.- "La unión estable y monogámica entre dos personas libres de vínculo matrimonial que formen un hogar de hecho, por el lapso y bajo las condiciones y circunstancias que señale la ley, generará los mismos derechos y obligaciones que tienen las familias constituidas mediante matrimonio. La adopción corresponderá sólo a parejas de distinto sexo."

That is: "The stable and monogamous union between two persons, free of matrimonial bond, who form a de facto couple, for the duration and under the conditions and circumstances that the law provides, will generate the same rights and obligations as held by families built through marriage. Adoption will pertain only to couples of different sexes."

Subsequent changes
Although civil unions were legalised in the 2008 Constitution, they were not formally recognized in the vital records until 15 September 2014, when the Directorate General of the Civil Registry began registering them nationwide. Three cities, Quito, Guayaquil and Cuenca, had already begun recognizing civil unions prior to September 2014. On 21 April 2015, the National Assembly approved a bill codifying same-sex civil unions into statutory law by a vote of 89–1. The bill also removed the requirement to have lived together for two years. President Rafael Correa signed it into law on 19 June 2015. The law changed article 222 of the Civil Code to read:

In Spanish: Art. 222.- "La unión estable y monogámica entre dos personas libres de vínculo matrimonial, mayores de edad, que formen un hogar de hecho, genera los mismos derechos y obligaciones que tienen las familias constituidas mediante matrimonio y da origen a una sociedad de bienes."

That is: "The stable and monogamous union between two persons, free of matrimonial bond, of legal age, who form a de facto couple, generates the same rights and obligations as held by families built through marriage and leads to a community property."

Statistics
By January 2018, 15,992 de facto unions had been registered in Ecuador, of which 3% were to same-sex couples.

Same-sex marriage

Under Article 67 of the 2008 Constitution, "marriage is the union between man and woman based on the free consent of the parties and their equal rights, obligations and legal capacity." However, on 12 June 2019 the Constitutional Court ruled that this article was unenforceable and void, and legalized same-sex marriage in Ecuador.

Background
During a series of interviews with local newspaper El Universo before the 2013 general election, two of the eight presidential candidates expressed their support for same-sex marriage: leftist candidates Alberto Acosta from the Plurinational Unity of the Lefts, and Norman Wray from the Ruptura 25 movement. President Rafael Correa did not participate in the interviews. However, in a 2011 interview for Radio France Internationale, Correa said that he "couldn't accept" same-sex marriage or abortion, although when asked if he would oppose legislation legalizing either of them, he referred only to abortion when saying that he would certainly oppose it. On 17 February 2013, President Correa was reelected by a wide margin. On 23 May 2013, he reiterated his opposition to same-sex marriage.

On 4 March 2016, the Provincial Government of Azuay unanimously approved an ordinance allowing symbolic same-sex marriages. The ordinance allowed same-sex couples to register their marriage with the Azuay Provincial Civil Registry, but the marriages were only symbolic with no legal effect. The first symbolic marriage was held in late June 2016 in Cuenca.

Before the 2017 presidential election, Paco Moncayo, candidate for the Democratic Left, said there should be a national debate on the legalisation of same-sex marriage. The election was won by Lenín Moreno, candidate for the PAIS Alliance, whose position on same-sex marriage was unknown, as he had refused to answer questions on the issue from activist Pamela Troya.

Legalization process

On 5 August 2013, LGBT groups launched a nationwide campaign under the name Matrimonio Civil Igualitario (Equal Civil Marriage), seeking to legalize same-sex marriage in Ecuador. A marriage petition was launched by activist Pamela Troya and her partner at the civil registry office in Quito. The petition was rejected days later, citing the country's Constitution and Civil Code. The couple announced on 8 August that they would file a lawsuit asking a judge to order the civil registry to marry them. The lawsuit was filed on 13 August 2013, for review by the Constitutional Court, and focused heavily on the Inter-American Court of Human Rights' decision in Atala Riffo and Daughters v. Chile, which held that sexual orientation is a suspect classification.

On 26 August 2013, a different couple went to the civil registry office in Guayaquil asking to be married. The couple, Santiago Vinces and Fernando Saltos, marched through the city to the civil registry office with a convoy of activists and supporters, including actress Érika Vélez. Their marriage petition was denied three days later, citing the same reasons given to the first couple.

2018 Inter-American Court of Human Rights ruling
On 9 January 2018, in advisory opinion OC 24/7, the Inter-American Court of Human Rights (IACHR) ruled that countries signatory to the American Convention on Human Rights are required to allow same-sex couples to marry. The ruling states that:

Ecuador ratified the American Convention on Human Rights on 28 December 1977 and recognized the court's jurisdiction on 4 July 1984. The ruling set binding precedent for Ecuadorian courts. LGBT activists urged the government to abide by the ruling, believing that Ecuador is required to recognise same-sex marriages under Article 417 of the Constitution:

June 2018 rulings
Following the IACHR ruling, two same-sex couples went to the civil registry office in Cuenca to apply for marriage licenses. After both couples were rejected, they filed separate lawsuits arguing that the refusal to allow them to marry was discriminatory, unconstitutional and a violation of the American Convention on Human Rights. Citing the IACHR ruling, two family judges ruled in favour of the couples on 29 June 2018. The judges ordered the civil registry to immediately begin registering same-sex marriages, but their decision was stayed pending appeal. The two cases had the support of the Azuay Provincial Government. On 10 September 2018, the Labor Chamber of the Provincial Court of Justice overturned both decisions, ruling that the issue of same-sex marriage should be handled by the National Assembly or the Constitutional Court.

2019 Constitutional Court ruling

On 28 July 2018, the president of the Constitutional Court, Alfredo Ruiz Guzmán, said he believed that a majority of judges on the court were in favour of legalizing same-sex marriage.

On 29 March 2019, a public hearing was held to determine whether the advisory opinion OC 24/7 issued by the IACHR on same-sex marriage was applicable to Ecuador, and whether it could be applied without a constitutional amendment or modifications to the Civil Code and the Organic Law of Identity and Civil Data Management. The case had been accepted for review by the Constitutional Court on 6 March 2019, following a request from the judges of the Provincial Court of Justice of Pichincha to review the legality of the civil marriage of Efraín Soria and Javier Benalcázar. The Constitutional Court had 45 days to issue a response and resolve the case. On 20 May 2019, another public hearing was held on a different same-sex marriage case.

A ruling in the cases was originally set for 4 June 2019, but was delayed as the judges were not able to reach a decision after several hours of discussion, and announced they would continue to convene over the following days. The court issued two rulings in favour of the couples, both by a 5–4 margin, on 12 June 2019. In the first ruling, the court held that the January 2018 IACHR ruling is fully binding on Ecuador and takes precedence over Ecuadorian domestic law. In its second ruling, the court re-wrote article 81 of the Civil Code, as well as article 52 of the identity and civil data management law, to remove gender-specific terms which implied that married spouses were of opposite sexes. The court ruled that Article 67 of the Constitution must be interpreted "in the sense that most favors the full validity of rights". On 14 June, the president of the Constitutional Court, Hernán Salgado Pesantes, said in a press conference that a constitutional amendment was not necessary to implement the decision, and that the National Assembly should reform the secondary laws as soon as possible. The decision also allows same-sex couples to marry in Ecuadorian embassies and diplomatic offices worldwide, as long as one partner is a citizen of Ecuador. The rulings took effect upon publication in the government gazette, the Registro Oficial, on 8 July 2019.

Article 81 of the Civil Code was amended to read: Marriage is a solemn contract by which two persons are united in order to live together and mutually help each other.

Human rights groups and LGBT activists welcomed the ruling, with Christian Paula of the Pakta Foundation, who had provided legal advice to several of the couples, saying that the ruling "implies that Ecuador is more egalitarian, more just than yesterday, and that it recognizes that human rights must fit all people without discrimination". In particular, LGBT activists noted that the wording used in the ruling would likely result in the legalisation of same-sex marriage in numerous other Latin American nations under the jurisdiction of the IACHR. The IACHR itself also welcomed the ruling. The Catholic Church expressed opposition to the ruling. In a national broadcast aired on 20 June, President Lenín Moreno expressed his "respect" for the decision of the Constitutional Court, saying, "our duty, as citizens, and my own, as President, is to respect the decisions of all the functions and organs of the State. I maintain my absolute respect for what has been done by the Constitutional Court, which is composed of serious and honest judges."

The first same-sex marriage occurred on 18 July in Guayaquil between Michelle Avilés and Alexandra Chávez.

Statistics
122 same-sex marriages took place in Ecuador in the first year of legalisation; 77 between male couples and 45 between lesbian couples.

According to statistics from the civil registry, 82 same-sex marriages were performed in 2019, 115 in 2020, and 240 in 2021, mostly in the provinces of Pichincha, Guayas and Manabí. There were also 5 same-sex divorces during those three years. No same-sex marriages occurred in Bolívar, Carchi, Napo, Orellana, Pastaza, Sucumbíos, and Zamora-Chinchipe provinces.

Public opinion
According to a Pew Research Center survey conducted between 7 November 2013 and 26 January 2014, 16% of Ecuadorians supported same-sex marriage, while 74% were opposed. According to the 2014 AmericasBarometer (published in June 2015), 16.5% of Ecuadorians were in favour of same-sex marriage. The 2017 AmericasBarometer poll showed that 33% of Ecuadorians supported same-sex marriage.

A July 2019 survey conducted by the Vanderbilt University showed that 51.3% of the Ecuador public opposed same-sex marriage, 36.8% "strongly". The poll found a significant age gap; 68.5% of the Silent Generation were opposed, followed by 62.5% of Baby boomers, 54.1% of Generation X, 42% of Millennials and 16.7% of Generation Z.

See also 

 LGBT rights in Ecuador
 Recognition of same-sex unions in the Americas
 Same-sex union court cases

Notes

References

External links
 

Ecuador
LGBT rights in Ecuador
2019 in LGBT history